Morgan Leonard Gould (born 23 March 1983) is a South African international footballer who plays professionally for Sekhukhune United as a defender.

Club career
Born in Soweto, Gould began his senior career with Jomo Cosmos in 2001, before moving to Supersport United in 2008. He signed for Kaizer Chiefs in May 2012.

Kaizer Chiefs
Gould was signed to Chiefs in July 2012 for R8.4million. He made his debut on 5 August 2012 against Mamelodi Sundowns losing 4-1. He scored his first goal against student outfit Bidvest Wits in the Nedbank Cup winning 3-0 with him scoring the second goal in 49th from a header from the near post. In the first half Siboniso Gaxa also scored his first goal for Chiefs. Earlier that day Orlando Pirates lost 4-1 to SAFA Second Division student outfit, Maluti FET College. He went to play only nine games and 721 minutes in the 2012-13 season due to an achilles tendon surgery and a knee injury only recovering in pre-season.

Supersport United
In July 2016, Gould made his return to Supersport United, to be reunited with his former Kaizer Chiefs coach Stuart Baxter. He made his first start in a league match of the PSL Absa Premiership 2016–2017 season, in a 1-0 loss to Platinum Stars.

International career
Gould made his international debut for South Africa in 2008, and was a squad member at the 2009 FIFA Confederations Cup.

International goals
Scores and results list South Africa's goal tally first.

Personal life
He is the son of late former Kaizer Chiefs and Penarol player Goodenough Nkomo.

References

1983 births
Living people
Sportspeople from Soweto
South African soccer players
South Africa international soccer players
Association football defenders
Jomo Cosmos F.C. players
SuperSport United F.C. players
Kaizer Chiefs F.C. players
Stellenbosch F.C. players
Sekhukhune United F.C. players
South African Premier Division players
2009 FIFA Confederations Cup players